Hotel Sorrento is a 1995 Australian drama film directed by Richard Franklin. Three sisters reunite in the sleepy Australian town of Sorrento after a ten-year hiatus. One of the three has written a book called Melancholy which is a thinly disguised version of their lives. The film is an adaptation of Hannie Rayson's 1990 play of the same name.

"One of the film's many fleeting reflections is an exploration of the word "melancholy" - a word that perfectly suits Hotel Sorrento's tone and pace."

Cast
Caroline Goodall as Meg Moynihan
Caroline Gillmer as Hilary Moynihan 	
Tara Morice as Pippa Moynihan
Joan Plowright as Marge Morrisey
Ray Barrett as Wal Moynihan
Nicholas Bell as Edwin
Ben Thomas as Troy Moynihan
John Hargreaves as Dick Bennett
Dave Barnett as Radio Announcer
Peter O'Callaghan as Radio Announcer
Jane Edmanson as Radio Announcer
Bill Howie as Radio Announcer
Sam Newman as Football Commentator
Shane Healy as Football Commentator
Phillip Lee as Auctioneer (voice)

Production
Richard Franklin had worked for a number of years in the US, although he had lived in Australia since 1985. He was becoming frustrated with Hollywood and decided to make a film for the "art house market". He contacted his brother in law, Peter Fitzgerald, who had written a number of books on Australian theatre and asked him to recommend an Australian play which might make a good film. Fitzpatrick put forward Hotel Sorrento and Franklin loved it. He made the movie having never seen a production of the play.

Critical reception
The New York Times said that "The film is steeped in a homey provincial atmosphere that is at once comforting and stifling, and that gives some substance to the talk about the complacency and materialism of Australian society and its indifference to artists." Cinephilia said "The play by Hannie Rayson, with its familiar typology of characters and Chekovian dialogue, no doubt provided pleasing entertainment in its original stage setting but as adapted by Franklin with Peter Fitzpatrick and transposed the big screen this story of a fraught family reunion of sorts looks like soapie material blown out of proportion (Meg’s line "I’m looking for Dick" is pure Number 96, albeit unintentionally so)."

Accolades

Box office
Hotel Sorrento grossed $1,215,478 at the box office in Australia.

Home media
Hotel Sorrento was released on DVD by Umbrella Entertainment in September 2012. The DVD is compatible with all region codes and includes special features such as the trailer, audio commentary with Richard Franklin and a featurette titled Inside Hotel Sorrento.

See also
Cinema of Australia

References

External links

Hotel Sorrento at Victoria Literary Map

1995 films
Australian drama films
1995 drama films
Films set in Victoria (Australia)
Films directed by Richard Franklin (director)
Films scored by Nerida Tyson-Chew
1990s English-language films